Brendan Stuart Walter (born June 16, 1986) is an American director, photographer, commercial, music video and film director, and the lead guitarist of Valencia.

Bio
Walter was born in Philadelphia, Pennsylvania. He attended Drexel University for one year and was one of 32 students sued by the RIAA in its first round file-sharing suits. He dropped out of school to begin touring and releasing records with the band Valencia from 2004 - 2011, when the band took an indefinite hiatus. Shortly there after, he moved to New York City to pursue a career in creative direction on the other side of music. He took a job at Crush Music and began overseeing creative work for their roster of artists. Since then he has moved on to film and TV with the launch of Crush Pictures  in 2017 with partner Jon Lullo.

Valencia
Walter spent seven years touring, writing and recording music with Valencia, first signing with I Surrender Records in 2005, then Columbia records in 2007. Valencia went on to release 3 major records.

On October 11, 2011, Valencia announced that they were going on hiatus. Their last show was at the Electric Factory on December 28, 2011. The band recently reunited for 2 sold out shows in Philadelphia and New York in December 2016.

Music videos and photography
After moving to New York, Walter began other creative pursuits. He has directed music videos, taken photos and designed album covers for artists such as Sia, Weezer, Lorde, Fall Out Boy, The Lonely Island, Train, Panic! at the Disco, Shawn Mendes, and many more.

Walter's work has landed him an MTV VMA and currently is nominated for Best Rock Video for the 2017 MTV Video Music Awards for his directing on Fall Out Boy's "Young and Menace" music video.

Walter's photography has been featured on billboards and album covers, from brands to bands all across the world. His main photography work lies in portraits, landscapes and product photography.

Film and television
His work in directing music videos and commercials has sparked a path towards narrative and feature films. Currently he is in post production on 2 films that he directed, writing and directing a Television show and developing several other projects. Currently Walter is editing his first feature-length film, Spell, a dark comedy  psychological thriller set and shot mostly in Iceland.

References

1986 births
Living people
American photographers
Artists from Philadelphia
Artists from Los Angeles
Drexel University alumni
Film directors from Los Angeles
Guitarists from Philadelphia
American male guitarists
21st-century American male musicians